Boris Karloff (1887-1969) was an English actor. He became known for his role as Frankenstein's monster in the 1931 Frankenstein (his 82nd film), leading to a long career in film, radio, and television.

Born William Henry Pratt in England, he emigrated to Canada in 1909 as a young man and eventually joined a Canadian touring company, adopting the stage name Boris Karloff. By 1919, Karloff moved to Hollywood where he found regular work as an extra at Universal Studios. Although he appeared in numerous silent films, Karloff's first significant roles were in Howard Hawks's The Criminal Code (1931) and Mervyn LeRoy's Five Star Final (1931). While shooting Graft, director James Whale convinced Karloff to star as Frankenstein's monster in Frankenstein, which led to him becoming an overnight superstar. After Frankenstein and starring in several high-profile films such as Bride of Frankenstein (1935) and The Mummy (1932), Karloff spent the remainder of the 1930s working at an incredible pace, but getting progressively involved in lower budget films. In the 1940s, he began to get stereotyped into playing "mad scientist" roles.

Karloff starred in a few highly acclaimed Val Lewton-produced horror films in the 1940s, and by the mid-1950s, he was a familiar presence on both television and radio, hosting his own TV series including Starring Boris Karloff, Colonel March of Scotland Yard, Thriller, Out of This World (British TV series) and The Veil, and guest starring on such programs as Suspense, The Donald O'Connor Show, I Spy and Route 66. He also played Detective Wong (five times) in the 1930s Mister Wong film series. In the 1960s, Karloff worked for Roger Corman at American International Pictures. He also made films in England, Italy and Spain. All told, he appeared in 174 motion pictures. His final American film was Peter Bogdanovich's Targets (1968), in which he portrayed an aging horror film star much like himself.

Filmography

Television and Newsreel Appearances
(Major appearances are highlighted in boldface)

Screen Snapshots #11 (1934) Karloff and Bela Lugosi appeared in this 10-minute newsreel feature, along with James Cagney and Maureen O'Sullivan (interviews) 
Hollywood Hobbies (1935) Karloff was interviewed briefly on this 10-minute newsreel feature which also featured Clark Gable and Buster Crabbe
The Chevrolet Tele-Theatre NBC-TV Show (Feb. 7, 1949) Episode Expert Opinion
The Ford Theatre Hour CBS-TV Anthology show (April 11, 1949) acted in the play Arsenic and Old Lace
Star Theatre (April 12, 1949)
Suspense CBS-TV Anthology show (April 26, 1949) Episode A Night at an Inn
The Chevrolet Tele-Theatre NBC-TV Show (May 9, 1949) Episode Passenger to Bali
Suspense CBS-TV Anthology show (May 17, 1949) Episode The Monkey's Paw
Suspense CBS-TV Anthology show (June 7, 1949) Episode The Yellow Scarf 
Celebrity Time ABC-TV Quiz Show (Sept. 4, 1949) – with host Conrad Nagel
Starring Boris Karloff Weekly ABC-TV Anthology Series (Sept. 22, 1949 - Dec. 15, 1949) – Karloff acted in 13 weekly 30-minute episodes; this show was broadcast as both a TV show and a radio show simultaneously (See subsection on Karloff's appearances on Starring Boris Karloff below.)
Inside U.S.A. with Chevrolet CBS-TV Variety Show (1949)
Supper Club (Feb. 19, 1950) Guest
Masterpiece Playhouse NBC-TV Anthology Series (Sept. 3, 1950) – co-starred with Eva Gabor in "Uncle Vanya", written by Anton Chekov
Lights Out NBC-TV Anthology show (Sept. 18, 1950) – appeared in 30-minute episode entitled "The Leopard Lady"
Paul Whiteman's Goodyear Revue ABC-TV variety show (Oct. 29, 1950) Karloff co-starred in a haunted house Halloween skit
The Texaco Star Theatre (aka The Milton Berle Show) (Dec. 12, 1950) NBC-TV comedy/variety show – Guest 
The Don McNeil TV Club ABC-TV variety show (April 11, 1951) Guest
The Texaco Star Theatre (aka The Milton Berle Show) (Oct. 9, 1951) Guest
The Fred Waring General Electric Show CBS-TV musical variety show (Oct. 21, 1951) Guest
Robert Montgomery Presents NBC-TV dramatic anthology show (Nov. 19, 1951) Karloff acted in a play entitled "The Kimballs"
Celebrity Time CBS-TV quiz show (Nov. 25, 1951) Karloff appeared with Kitty Carlisle and host Conrad Nagel
Studio One CBS-TV Anthology show (Dec. 3, 1951) Karloff acted in a play entitled "Mutiny on the Nicolette" 
Suspense CBS-TV Anthology show (Christmas Day, 1951) Episode The Lonely Place; co-starred Judith Evelyn
Lux Video Theatre CBS-TV Anthology Show (Dec. 31, 1951) Karloff played Arthur Strangways in a play entitled "The Jest of Hahalaba" (written by Lord Dunsany)
Columbia Workshop (aka CBS Television Workshop) – CBS-TV Anthology Show (Jan. 13, 1952) Karloff played the title role in a play Don Quixote
The Stork Club CBS-TV Talk show (Jan. 30, 1952) interviewed by host Sherman Billingsley
Tales of Tomorrow ABC-TV Sci-Fi Anthology Show (Feb. 22, 1952) Episode "Memento"
The Texaco Star Theatre (aka The Milton Berle Show) (April 29, 1952) Guest
Studio One CBS-TV Anthology show (May 19, 1952) Karloff played King Arthur in a radio play entitled A Connecticut Yankee in King Arthur's Court by Mark Twain; co-starred Thomas Mitchell
Celebrity Time CBS-TV Quiz show (May 25, 1952) with Orson Bean and host Conrad Nagel
Philip Morris Playhouse on Broadway (June 1, 1952) Karloff acted in a radio play called "Outward Bound"
I've Got a Secret CBS-TV Quiz show (June 19, 1952)
Curtain Call NBC-TV Anthology show (June 27, 1952) episode "Soul of the Great Bell"
Schlitz Playhouse of Stars NBC-TV Anthology show (July 4, 1952) with Host Irene Dunne; Karloff acted in a radio play entitled "House of Death"
Lux Video Theatre NBC-TV Anthology show (Dec. 8, 1952) Karloff and Bramwell Fletcher acted in a radio play entitled "Fear"
Who's There? CBS-TV Quiz show (1952) with host Arlene Francis
The Texaco Star Theatre (aka The Milton Berle Show) (Dec. 16, 1952) Guest
All Star Revue Musical-Comedy show (Jan. 17, 1953) co-featuring Peter Lorre and Martha Raye
Hollywood Opening Night NBC-TV Anthology show (March 2, 1953) Episode "The Invited Seven"
Suspense CBS-TV Anthology show (Mar. 17, 1953) Episode The Black Prophet; Karloff played Rasputin
Robert Montgomery Presents NBC-TV Anthology show (Mar. 30, 1953) Episode "Burden of Proof"
Tales of Tomorrow Sci-fi Anthology show (Apr. 3, 1953) Karloff starred in an episode entitled "Past Tense"
Quick as a Flash (May 7, 1953) Quiz Show
Plymouth Playhouse (aka "ABC Album") ABC-TV Anthology show (May 25, 1953) with Host Cedric Hardwicke; Karloff starred in 2 episodes entitled "The Chaser" and "The Reticence of Lady Anne"
Suspense CBS-TV Anthology show (June 23, 1953) episode "The Signal Man" (written by Charles Dickens)
Rheingold Theatre NBC-TV Anthology show (1953) episode "House of Death"
I've Got a Secret CBS-TV Quiz show (Oct. 13, 1954) appeared with Host Garry Moore, Bill Cullen and Kitty Carlisle
The George Gobel Show (Nov. 6, 1954) Guest
Truth or Consequences (Nov. 9, 1954) Guest
Climax! CBS-TV Anthology show (Dec. 16, 1954) Episode The White Carnation, with Host William Lundigan
Down You Go TV Quiz Show on the Dumont Network (Dec. 17, 1954) appeared with Phil Rizzuto and others
Colonel March of Scotland Yard – 26-episode British TV series starring Karloff as a detective. First broadcast in the U.S weekly from Dec. 1954-Spring, 1955; later broadcast in U.K. weekly from Sept. 24, 1955-March 17, 1956
The Best of Broadway CBS-TV Anthology show (Jan. 5, 1955) Karloff acted in a TV version of "Arsenic and Old Lace", co-starring Peter Lorre, Helen Hayes, Orson Bean and Edward Everett Horton
The Donald O'Connor Texaco Star Theatre NBC-TV Sitcom (Feb. 19, 1955) Karloff sang two songs, Arry and Erbert and The Human Thing To Do 
The Elgin Hour ABC-TV Anthology show (Feb. 22, 1955); Episode "The Sting of Death"
Max Liebman Presents NBC-TV Musical Variety show (Mar. 12, 1955) a musical version of "A Connecticut Yankee in King Arthur's Court" by Mark Twain; Karloff performed two songs, co-featuring Eddie Albert
Who Said That? TV Quiz Show on the Dumont Network (April 30, 1955) with host John K. M. McCaffrey
General Electric Theatre CBS-TV Anthology show (May 1, 1955) with host Ronald Reagan; episode "Mr. Blue Ocean", co-starring Bramwell Fletcher, Eli Wallach, Susan Strasberg and Anthony Perkins
Boris Karloff (July 15, 1955) British TV show about Karloff's life
I've Got a Secret CBS-TV Quiz show (Aug. 24, 1955) with host Garry Moore, Bill Cullen and Kitty Carlisle
The U.S. Steel Hour (aka Alcoa Hour) CBS-TV Anthology show (Aug. 31, 1955) episode "Counterfeit"
The Alcoa Hour NBC-TV Anthology show (April 15, 1956) episode "Even the Weariest River", co-starring Christopher Plummer and Franchot Tone
The Amazing Dunninger ABC-TV Mind-reading show (July 18, 1956) Guest
Frankie Laine Time CBS-TV Musical Variety show (Aug. 1 and Aug. 8, 1956) Karloff performed on this variety show two weeks in a row
The Ernie Kovacs Show NBC-TV Comedy show (Aug. 13, 1956) Guest
Climax! CBS-TV Anthology show (Sept. 6, 1956) episode "Bury Me Later", with Torin Thatcher and Angela Lansbury
Playhouse 90 CBS-TV Anthology show (Oct. 25, 1956) episode "Rendezvous in Black", by Cornell Woolrich.
The Red Skelton Show CBS-TV Comedy show (Nov. 27, 1956) Guest
The $64,000 Question CBS-TV Quiz show (December 11, 18 and 25, 1956) Karloff appeared three times and won $32,000 in the "Children's Fairy Tales" category
The Rosemary Clooney Show NBC-TV Variety show (Jan. 9, 1957) Karloff played the Big Bad Wolf in a Little Red Riding Hood skit and sang a song called "You'd Be Surprised"
Hallmark Hall of Fame NBC-TV Anthology show (Feb. 10, 1957) Karloff played Bishop Cauchon in a 90-minute Made-for-TV version of the play The Lark, co-starring Basil Rathbone, Julie Harris (as Joan of Arc), Denholm Elliott, Jack Warden and Eli Wallach
Lux Video Theatre NBC-TV Anthology show (Apr. 25, 1957) Karloff played Montgomery Royle in an episode called "The Man Who Played God"
The Kate Smith Special ABC-TV Variety show (Apr. 28, 1957) Karloff sang a song called "The September Song" on this program
The Dinah Shore Chevy Show NBC-TV Variety show (May 17, 1957) Karloff sang "Mama Look a' Boo Boo" on this variety program
A to Z (British TV show) (Aug. 30, 1957) Guest
The Dinah Shore Chevy Show NBC-TV Variety show (Oct. 27, 1957) Karloff appeared in a Halloween skit; show co-featured the Skylarks and the Steiner Brothers
The Rosemary Clooney Show NBC-TV Variety show (Halloween, 1957) Karloff did a musical number
The Gisele MacKenzie Show (Nov. 16, 1957) Guest
This Is Your Life (Nov. 20, 1957) Karloff was feted on this show which guest-starred Evelyn Karloff and makeup artist Jack Pierce among other people from Karloff's past; hosted by Ralph Edwards
Suspicion NBC-TV Anthology show (Dec. 9, 1957) episode "The Deadly Game", co-starring Gary Merrill and Joseph Wiseman, hosted by Dennis O'Keefe; Karloff played Judge Withrop Gelsey
The Betty White Show ABC-TV Variety show (Feb. 12, 1958) guest-starred Karloff and Buster Keaton among others
Telephone Time ABC-TV Anthology show (Feb. 25, 1958) episode "The Vestris";  this episode was made as a pilot for Karloff's 1958 12-episode anthology series The Veil, but was shown separately from the other episodes on Telephone Time
Shirley Temple's Storybook NBC-TV Anthology show for children (Mar. 5, 1958) Shirley Temple and John Ericson costarred in this one-hour TV version of "The Legend of Sleepy Hollow", narrated by Boris Karloff
Studio One CBS-TV Anthology show (March 31, 1958) Karloff played as Professor Theodore Koenig in the episode "The Shadow of a Genius"
The Jack Paar Show NBC-TV Talk Show (aka The Tonight Show)(April 22, 1958) Jack Paar interviewed Karloff
The Veil (1958) 12-episode Anthology show (similar to The Twilight Zone) produced by Hal Roach Jr; Karloff hosted each episode and starred in all but one of them (Jack the Ripper); the series was never broadcast nor syndicated, but is available today on DVD (several episodes were later re-edited into 3 different feature-length films to be shown on late night TV)
Playhouse 90 CBS-TV Anthology show (Nov. 6, 1958) Karloff played Captain Kurtz in this 90-minute Made-for-TV version of "Heart of Darkness" by Joseph Conrad;  co-starring Eartha Kitt, Oscar Homolka and Roddy McDowall
The Gale Storm Show CBS-TV sitcom (Jan. 31, 1959) co-starring Zasu Pitts in an episode entitled "It's Murder, My Dear"
General Electric Theatre (aka GE Theatre) - CBS-TV Anthology show (May 17, 1959) hosted by Ronald Reagan; Karloff plays Henry Church in an episode called "Indian Giver", co-starring Edgar Buchanan and Jackie Coogan
Playhouse 90 CBS-TV Anthology show (Feb. 9, 1960) Karloff played a character named Guibert in an episode called "To the Sound of Trumpets", costarring Judith Anderson, Stephen Boyd and Sam Jaffe
The Du Pont Show of the Month CBS-TV Anthology show (Mar. 5, 1960) produced by David Susskind; Karloff played a pirate named "Billy Bones" in this 90-minute Made-for-TV adaptation of Robert Louis Stevenson's "Treasure Island", co-starring Michael Gough and Barry Morse, among others.
Hollywood Sings NBC-TV Variety show (April 3, 1960) Karloff sang a song on this program, which co-featured Eddie Albert and Tammy Grimes
Upgreen and At' em: or, A Maiden Nearly Over (British TV show) (June 6, 1960) Guest
The Secret World of Eddie Hodges - CBS-TV Musical Special (June 23, 1960) – A one-hour Musical Special directed in N.Y. City by Norman Jewison, featuring Boris Karloff (as Capt. Hook), Margaret Hamilton, Bert Lahr, Hugh O'Brien and others, narrated by Jackie Gleason.
Thriller NBC-TV Anthology show (Sept. 13, 1960-April 30, 1962) Sixty-six hour-long episode B&W series hosted by Karloff, who also acted in five of the episodes themselves: "The Premature Burial" (10/2/60), "The Prediction" (11/22/60), "Last of the Sommervilles" (11/6/61), "Dialogues with Death" which consisted of two 30-minute stories (12/4/61), and "The Incredible Dr. Markesan" (2/26/62); the other episodes were only hosted by Karloff
The Hallmark Hall of Fame NBC-TV Anthology show (Feb. 5, 1962) Karloff acted in this 90-minute Made-for-TV adaptation of "Arsenic and Old Lace", co-starring Tony Randall, Tom Bosley, Mildred Natwick and others; Karloff played Jonathan Brewster
PM syndicated Talk Show (Feb. 12, 1962) Mike Wallace interviewed Karloff, Tony Randall, Kim Hunter, Ed Wynn and Julie Harris.
Theatre '62 NBC-TV Anthology show (Mar. 11, 1962) Karloff played a character named Simon Flaquer in an  episode entitled "The Paradine Case", co-starring Richard Basehart, Robert Webber and Viveca Lindfors
The Dickie Henderson Show a British Variety show (June 1962) Karloff appeared on this show while he was filming Out of this World in England
Out of This World (British TV series) – ABC-TV British Sci-Fi Anthology show produced in England by BBC-TV (broadcast June 30-Sept. 22, 1962) Thirteen one-hour episodes hosted by Karloff; stories adapted from the works of John Wyndham, Terry Nation, Isaac Asimov, Philip K. Dick and others (Karloff filmed these immediately after the Thriller TV series ended production.)
Route 66 CBS-TV Drama show (Oct. 26, 1962) Karloff appeared as the Frankenstein Monster in this episode entitled "Lizard's Leg and Owlet's Wing", co-starring Lon Chaney Jr. (as The Wolf Man/ Mummy), Peter Lorre, Martin Milner and George Maharis.
I've Got a Secret Game Show (Jan. 28, 1963)  Guest
The Hy Gardner Show WOR-TV Talk Show (March 3, 1963) Karloff and Peter Lorre were both interviewed in this episode
Chronicle CBS-TV Documentary show (Christmas Day, 1963) Karloff narrated "A Danish Fairy Tale" (a biography of Hans Christian Andersen)
Today's Teens (Jan., 1964) 11-minute newsreel feature narrated by Karloff
The Garry Moore Show CBS-TV Variety show (Apr. 21, 1964) also featuring Alan King and Dorothy Loudon
The Tonight Show Starring Johnny Carson (NBC-TV talk show) (June, 1964) Guest
The Entertainers CBS-TV Variety show (Jan. 16, 1965) also featuring Carol Burnett and Art Buchwald
Shindig ABC-TV Musical show (Oct. 30, 1965) Karloff sang The Peppermint Twist and The Monster Mash; also costarred Ted Cassidy and Jimmy O'Neill
The Wild Wild West CBS-TV Western program (Sept. 23, 1966) Karloff played a villain named Singh on an episode entitled "Night of the Golden Cobra", co-starred Robert Conrad and Ross Martin
The Girl from U.N.C.L.E. NBC-TV Adventure series (Sept. 27, 1966) Karloff played a transvestite character named Mother Muffin in an episode entitled "The Mother Muffin Affair", co-starring Stefanie Powers, Leo G. Carroll, Robert Vaughn and Noel Harrison
Dr. Seuss' How the Grinch Stole Christmas'' - 30-minute CBS-TV animated cartoon (broadcast Dec. 18, 1966) - narrated by Karloff who also does the voice of the Grinch; directed by Chuck Jones, this animated TV Special won Grammy Award for Best Album for Children I Spy NBC-TV Adventure series (Sept. 24, 1968) Karloff travelled to Spain to play Don Ernesto Silvando in this episode entitled "Mainly on the Plains", co-starring Robert Culp, Bill Cosby and (future Spanish horror film star) Paul Naschy in an uncredited bit part The Red Skelton Show CBS-TV Variety show (Sept. 24, 1968) Karloff and Vincent Price sung a duet called "The Two of Us" on this show, and acted together in a skit called "He Who Steals My Robot Steals Trash" The Jonathan Winters Show CBS-TV Variety show (Oct. 30, 1968) Karloff sang "It Was a Very Good Year" on this program, which also featured Agnes Moorehead, Abby Dalton, Alice Ghostly, Paul Lynde and othersThe Name of the Game NBC-TV adventure series (Nov. 29, 1968) Karloff played a character called Mikhail Orlov in this 90-minute episode entitled "The White Birch", co-starring Susan Saint James, Roddy McDowall, Gene Barry, Peter Deuel, Ben Gazzara, Richard Jaeckel and Susan Oliver; this was Karloff's final dramatic performance, broadcast just weeks before his death.

 Appearances on Starring Boris Karloff 
Karloff acted in 13 episodes of the "Starring Boris Karloff" anthology TV/ radio series in 1949: this show was broadcast as both a TV show and a radio show simultaneously
"Five Golden Guineas" (Sept. 21, 1949)
"The Mask" (Sept. 28, 1949)
"Mungahara" (Oct. 5, 1949)
"Mad Illusion" (Oct. 12, 1949)
"Perchance To Dream" (Oct. 19, 1949)
"The Devil Takes a Bride" (Oct. 26, 1949)
"The Moving Finger" (Nov. 2, 1949)
"The Twisted Path" (Nov. 9, 1949)
"False Face" (Nov. 16, 1949)
"Cranky Bill" (Nov. 23, 1949)
"Three O'Clock" (Nov. 30, 1949)
"The Shop at Sly Corner" (Dec. 7, 1949)
"The Night Reveals" (Dec. 14, 1949)Nollen, Scott Allen (1991). Boris Karloff: A Critical Account of His Screen, Stage, Radio, Television, and Recording Work. McFarland & Company. p. 417. ISBN 978-0-89950-580-0.

Stage performances (from 1928 on)The Idiot (January 25-28, 1928) Belmont Theatre, Los AngelesMonna Vanna (April 23-May 2, 1928) Karloff played Guido Collona; Los AngelesFor the Soul of Rafael (opened May 3, 1928) Los AngelesHotel Imperial (opened May 23, 1928) Karloff played General Juskievica; Los AngelesWindow Panes (opened Aug. 5, 1928) Karloff played Artem Tiapkin; Los AngelesKongo (1929) Karloff played "Kregg"  at the Capitol Theatre in San FranciscoThe Criminal Code (Opened May 12, 1930) Karloff played "Galloway" in San Francisco and Los Angeles in 1930 (he reprised the role in the 1931 film version the following year).Mud, Blood and Kisses (Nov. 17, 1934) Karloff appeared in this one-night performance in Padua, CaliforniaThe Drunkard (Oct. 19, 1936) Karloff appeared as a guest-star for one night in this play at the Theatre Mart in Hollywood, to celebrate the play's 1200th performanceThe Tell-Tale Heart (1938) Karloff toured with this play in April 1938, which he only narratedArsenic and Old Lace (beginning Dec. 26, 1940) Karloff starred as Jonathan Brewster for 2 weeks in Baltimore, Md.Arsenic and Old Lace (Jan. 10, 1941-June, 1942) Fulton Theatre and West Point Military Academy in N.Y.; co-starred with Josephine Hull and Wyrley BirchNight of the Stars (Nov. 26, 1941) appeared for one night at Madison Square Garden, NYThe Navy Relief Show (Mar. 10, 1942) played at Madison Square Garden, NY for one night, with Eddie Cantor, Danny Kaye, Ed Wynn, Clifton Webb and Vincent PriceArsenic and Old Lace (Aug. 17, 1942-Jan. 23, 1944) on tour (Los Angeles, San Francisco, Chicago, Milwaukee, Boston, Washington DC, Seattle, Kansas City, and back to Washington DC and Kansas City again)Arsenic and Old Lace (Feb. to June, 1945) U.S.O. Pacific tour (Midway, Oahu, Marshall Islands, etc.)On Borrowed Time (Nov. 5-Nov. 24, 1946) Karloff played "Gramps" in San Francisco and Los Angeles The Linden Tree (Feb 4-Mar. 6, 1948) toured Connecticut, Pennsylvania, Washington DC, and at The Music Box Theatre in N.Y.; co-starred Una O'Connor and Noel LeslieOn Borrowed Time (March, 1947) played "Gramps" again for one week in Mexico CityThe Shop at Sly Corner (December 25, 1948-Jan. 22, 1949) played Boston, Mass. and the Booth Theater in N.Y.;  co-starred Una O'Connor, Jay RobinsonOn Borrowed Time (Jan. 16, 1950-Feb. 4, 1950) played "Gramps" again at the Penthouse Theater in Atlanta, GeorgiaPeter Pan (April 24, 1950-January 27, 1951) ran 321 performances at the Imperial and St. James Theatres in N.Y., co-starred Jean Arthur as Peter Pan, Karloff as Captain Hook, Marcia Henderson as Wendy, and Nehemiah Persoff as CeccoPeter Pan (Jan. 27, 1951-Apr. 29, 1951) toured as Captain Hook in Boston, Cincinnati, Cleveland, Detroit and MinneapolisNight of 100 Stars (June 25, 1955) Karloff played a drunken butler at a one-night fundraiser for the Actors' Orphanage at the London Palladium in EnglandThe Lark (Oct. 28, 1955-Nov. 12, 1955) Karloff played Bishop Cauchon at the Plymouth Theatre in BostonThe Lark (Nov. 17, 1955-June 2, 1956) ran 229 performances at the Longacre Theater in N.Y.; featuring Julie Harris as Joan of Arc, Karloff as Bishop Cauchon, Christopher Plummer as Warwick, and Joseph Wiseman as the InquisitorThe Lark (opened Sept. 5, 1956) played approximately 3 weeks in San FranciscoArsenic and Old Lace (March 21-23, 1957) played Jonathan Brewster for 3 days at a high school in Anchorage, AlaskaArsenic and Old Lace (Jan. 12-17, 1960) Tapia Theatre in San Juan, Puerto RicoOn Borrowed Time (opened Jan. 17, 1961) played "Gramps" at the Tapia Theatre in San Juan, Puerto RicoOn Borrowed Time'' (March 17–25, 1961) played "Gramps" at the Wharf Theatre in Monterey, Cal.; Karloff's final stage play

References
Sources
 
 
 
 

Citations

External links
 

Male actor filmographies
British filmographies
American filmographies
Boris Karloff